Buster Mathis Jr. (born March 25, 1970) is an American former professional boxer who competed in the heavyweight division.

Early life

Mathis Jr. was the son of Buster Mathis, a heavyweight boxer from the 1960s. The senior Mathis had been invited to the 1964 Tokyo Olympics, and was a contender with fights against champions Muhammad Ali and Joe Frazier. Mathis Jr. was a heavy man and took up boxing because he was bullied as a child until the age of 14, and also for the benefit of losing extra weight. Mathis Jr. attended Grandville Public Schools in Grandville, Michigan, from 1979 until he graduated in 1988.

Professional career

Mathis Jr. turned pro in 1991 and quickly put together 12 wins. A busy, crowding fighter, Mathis was small for a heavyweight at around 220 lbs but skilled enough to beat fairly respected fighters like Levi Billups, Justin Fortune and Mike Dixon very early in his career. Buster Mathis encouraged his son to fewer higher paying fights, using the Mathis name to his advantage. He was considered a weak puncher (3 KO's in those 12 fights) but his opposition was above average.

In 1993 he challenged Mike 'The Bounty' Hunter (23-3) for his USBA heavyweight belt. Hunter won a close decision over Mathis. The loss however was soon voided after Hunter later tested positive for cocaine.

In 1994 Mathis again contested the USBA belt (stripped from Hunter), this time winning an impressive 12-round decision over ex-Olympic champion Tyrell Biggs (27-7).

In August of that year Mathis was brought in as the comeback opponent for former undisputed champion Riddick Bowe. After a good effort bobbing and weaving out of the way of Bowe's best shots, Mathis began to fall behind and took a knee in the fourth. Bowe knocked Mathis out while he was on the mat, yet instead of being disqualified, referee Arthur Mercante Sr. and New Jersey commission boss Larry Hazzard agreed to void the contest.

In 1995 Mathis retained his USBA belt with a point win over contender Alex Garcia, thus setting up a fight with Mike Tyson. This was Tyson's second fight since being released from prison earlier in the year.

Mathis Sr. did not see his son's fight with Tyson due to his final battle was health problems of diabetes and kidney issues. Mathis Sr. died a few weeks before the Tyson fight. In the third round Tyson knocked Mathis Jr. out with a right uppercut. Ten days after the Tyson fight Mathis Jr.'s trainer and long time friend Joey Fariello died, and Mathis Jr. quickly lost his spark for the sport.

A 1996 fight with prospect Obed Sullivan ended with a no contest in the 5th round, after Sullivan was badly cut in a clash of heads. This was the third no contest in Mathis Jr.'s relatively brief career.

In November 1996 Mathis lost his USBA belt to undefeated Lou Savarese.

Mathis retired at the age of 26 with a 21-2 (7 KO's) record, and 3 no contests.

After boxing

After his boxing career he studied education receiving a bachelor's degree from the University of Miami. He currently resides in his hometown of Grand Rapids, Michigan and spends his free time speaking to youth to encourage and motivate them, signing autographs and speaking to foster children. Buster Mathis is now the vice president of a non-profit, Buster Mathis Inc. (www.thebullybuster.org) and offers elementary children the Bully Buster Prevention Program through a boxing technique called the 'peek-a-boo'.  Buster Mathis is single and has no children at this time. Buster also is a substitute teacher on his off time, most recently at East Kentwood High School. On October 20, 2016, Buster Mathis Jr. was inducted into the Grand Rapids (MI) Sports Hall of Fame, joining his father who was previously inducted.

Professional boxing record

|-
|align="center" colspan=8|21 Wins (7 knockouts, 14 decisions), 2 Losses (2 knockouts), 3 No Contests 
|-
| align="center" style="border-style: none none solid solid; background: #e3e3e3"|Result
| align="center" style="border-style: none none solid solid; background: #e3e3e3"|Record
| align="center" style="border-style: none none solid solid; background: #e3e3e3"|Opponent
| align="center" style="border-style: none none solid solid; background: #e3e3e3"|Type
| align="center" style="border-style: none none solid solid; background: #e3e3e3"|Round
| align="center" style="border-style: none none solid solid; background: #e3e3e3"|Date
| align="center" style="border-style: none none solid solid; background: #e3e3e3"|Location
| align="center" style="border-style: none none solid solid; background: #e3e3e3"|Notes
|-align=center
|Loss
|
|align=left| Lou Savarese
|TKO
|7
|1 Nov 1996
|align=left| Fantasy Springs Resort Casino, Indio, California
|align=left|
|-
|No Contest
|
|align=left| Obed Sullivan
|NC
|5
|20 Apr 1996
|align=left| Ralph Engelstad Arena, Grand Forks, North Dakota
|align=left|
|-
|Win
|
|align=left| Ken Smith
|KO
|4
|27 Feb 1996
|align=left| Morula Sun Casino, Mabopane, North West
|align=left|
|-
|Loss
|
|align=left| Mike Tyson
|KO
|3
|16 Dec 1995
|align=left| Core State Spectrum, Philadelphia, Pennsylvania
|align=left|
|-
|Win
|
|align=left| Mike Acklie
|TKO
|1
|5 Aug 1995
|align=left| New Mexico State Fair, Albuquerque, New Mexico
|align=left|
|-
|Win
|
|align=left| Alex Garcia
|UD
|12
|18 Apr 1995
|align=left| The Aladdin, Las Vegas, Nevada
|align=left|
|-
|Win
|
|align=left| Ken Smith
|UD
|10
|4 Feb 1995
|align=left| Silver Nugget, Las Vegas, Nevada
|align=left|
|-
|Win
|
|align=left| Garing Lane
|TKO
|9
|3 Dec 1994
|align=left| Harlingen, Texas
|align=left|
|-
|Win
|
|align=left| Lyle McDowell
|TKO
|5
|5 Nov 1994
|align=left| Caesars Tahoe, Stateline, Nevada
|align=left|
|-
|Win
|
|align=left| Mike Lee Faulkner
|UD
|10
|1 Oct 1994
|align=left| The Roxy, Boston, Massachusetts
|align=left|
|-
|No Contest
|
|align=left| Riddick Bowe
|NC
|4
|13 Aug 1994
|align=left| Boardwalk Hall, Atlantic City, New Jersey
|align=left|
|-
|Win
|
|align=left| Sherman Griffin
|MD
|10
|2 Apr 1994
|align=left| Tokyo
|align=left|
|-
|Win
|
|align=left| Tyrell Biggs
|UD
|12
|5 Feb 1994
|align=left| The Aladdin, Las Vegas, Nevada
|align=left|
|-
|No Contest
|
|align=left| Mike Hunter
|NC
|12
|4 Dec 1993
|align=left| USS Lexington Museum, Corpus Christi, Texas
|align=left|
|-
|Win
|
|align=left| Mike Dixon
|UD
|10
|2 Oct 1993
|align=left| Resorts Casino Hotel, Atlantic City, New Jersey
|align=left|
|-
|Win
|
|align=left| Mark Young
|UD
|10
|7 Aug 1993
|align=left| Resorts Casino Hotel, Atlantic City, New Jersey
|align=left|
|-
|Win
|
|align=left| Levi Billups
|PTS
|10
|10 Jul 1993
|align=left| Fernwood Resort, Bushkill, Pennsylvania
|align=left|
|-
|Win
|
|align=left| Carl Williams
|TKO
|5
|15 Jun 1993
|align=left| The Palace of Auburn Hills, Auburn Hills, Michigan
|align=left|
|-
|Win
|
|align=left| Justin Fortune
|TKO
|8
|14 Feb 1993
|align=left| Las Vegas, Nevada
|align=left|
|-
|Win
|
|align=left| Ty Evans
|PTS
|6
|22 Sep 1992
|align=left| The Palace of Auburn Hills, Auburn Hills, Michigan
|align=left|
|-
|Win
|
|align=left| Jordan Keepers
|PTS
|6
|24 Apr 1992
|align=left| Beloit, Wisconsin
|align=left|
|-
|Win
|
|align=left| Tim Martin
|TKO
|5
|21 Apr 1992
|align=left| The Palace of Auburn Hills, Auburn Hills, Michigan
|align=left|
|-
|Win
|
|align=left| Luis Torres
|PTS
|4
|21 Mar 1992
|align=left| Cleveland, Ohio
|align=left|
|-
|Win
|
|align=left| Tracy Thomas
|PTS
|4
|3 Mar 1992
|align=left| Livonia, Michigan
|align=left|
|-
|Win
|
|align=left| Rusty Williams
|PTS
|4
|8 Feb 1992
|align=left| Lansing, Michigan
|align=left|
|-
|Win
|
|align=left| Ahmad Gihad
|PTS
|4
|9 Dec 1991
|align=left| Waukesha, Wisconsin
|align=left|
|}

References

External links 
 

Living people
Heavyweight boxers
Boxers from Michigan
1970 births
Sportspeople from Grand Rapids, Michigan
American male boxers
People from East Grand Rapids, Michigan